Adi Litia Qionibaravi is a Fijian chief and former member of the Parliament of Fiji. She is a member of the Social Democratic Liberal Party.

Personal life
Qionibaravi is from Ucunivanua in Verata, Tailevu Province. She trained as a lawyer, then worked as a civil servant, serving more than thirty years in the Fijian Affairs Ministry. On 17 June 2005 she was appointed for a five-year term as chief executive officer of the Fijian Affairs Board (FAB).  In this capacity, she oversaw the work of the country's fourteen Provincial Councils, the Fijian Affairs scholarship unit, and the Secretariat of the Great Council of Chiefs.

Dismissal

On 13 December 2006 Qionibaravi was purportedly dismissed by the military regime after the 2006 Fijian coup d'état. The Military cited her alleged unwillingness to cooperate with the interim administration.  Fiji Live reported that three armed soldiers had evicted her from her office in the building of the Native Lands Trust Board (NLTB).

Fiji Television reported on 24 December, however, that she had refused to accept her dismissal.  Ratu Ovini Bokini, Chairman of the Great Council of Chiefs supported her stance, claiming that only the FAB was empowered to terminate her contract. She continued to work from an improvised office in the Great Council of Chiefs Secretariat, in defiance of the regime, which appointed Ratu Meli Bainimarama, brother of Military Commander Commodore Frank Bainimarama, in her stead. Commodore Bainimarama reacted angrily on 17 December, with Fiji Live quoting him as saying that the stance of the Great Council of Chiefs in refusing to recognize Qionibaravi's dismissal was indicative of their noncooperation with the Military regime.

The Fijian Affairs Board formalized the termination of Qionibaravi's contract on 20 January 2007.  The newly appointed board - consisting of five interim Cabinet Ministers and chaired by Ratu Epeli Ganilau, the Interim Minister for Fijian Affairs formally dismissed her at an emergency meeting called "to regularize the issue of Adi Litia," in Ganilau's words.

Corruption allegations
On 22 December, Commodore Bainimarama was quoted in Fiji Village as accusing Qionibaravi of having misused government funds to buy a personal vehicle and to pay the two workers renovating her house in Ma'afu Street, Suva. On 23 December, Qionibaravi replied that she was "shocked" to hear the allegations, but refused to comment further. On 23 December, however, she held a press conference and angrily denied the allegations, saying that she owned no house in Ma'afu Street; she had an FAB office there, she said.  The car had been purchased with a loan approved by her superior, the Permanent Secretary for Fijian Affairs, the Fiji Times quoted her as saying.

Political career
Qionibaravi was appointed general secretary of the Social Democratic Liberal Party in February 2016. As general secretary, she reformed the party constitution. She was elected to parliament in the 2018 elections, winning 2,195 votes. She was the Opposition nominee for the role of Deputy Speaker, but lost in a parliamentary vote to Veena Bhatnagar.

On 25 July 2021 she was arrested by Fijian police after criticising government moves to amend land legislation.

In the 2022 General Elections, she did not run for re-election to Parliament, and retired.

References

Year of birth missing (living people)
Living people
Fijian chiefs
Fijian civil servants
People from Tailevu Province
Social Democratic Liberal Party politicians
Members of the Parliament of Fiji
21st-century Fijian women politicians
21st-century Fijian politicians